The Rugby League Hall of Fame honours the leading players of the sport of rugby league.  It was established by the sport's governing body in the UK, the Rugby Football League, in 1988.  Players must have been retired for at least five years to be eligible; they must also have played at least ten years within the British game.  Players are chosen for induction to the hall of fame by a panel consisting of sports writers, broadcasters and officials.

Inductions to the hall of fame have been sporadic.  Nine players were inducted when the hall was opened in 1988 and one more was added the following year. In 1995 the members of the hall of fame appeared on postage stamps released as part of Britain's centenary celebrations. There were no new inductees until 2000, when three more players were introduced as part of the buildup to the 2000 Rugby League World Cup. A further four players were inducted in 2005, and four more in 2013 during the fourteenth World Cup.

The Hall of Fame is located at the George Hotel in Huddersfield, where a group of northern clubs met in 1895 and resolved to leave the Rugby Football Union to form their own body, which led to the development of the separate codes of rugby league and rugby union.

Hall of Fame members

See also
Australian Rugby League Hall of Fame

References

External links
Rugby League Hall of Fame at rugby-league.com

Rugby league in the United Kingdom
Halls of fame in the United Kingdom
Rugby league museums and halls of fame
Awards established in 1988
1988 establishments in the United Kingdom